Katha Sangama is an Indian Kannada-language anthology film composed of seven short films directed by seven directors includes the 777 Charlie fame Kiranraj K, Chandrajith Belliappa, Shashi Kumar P, Rahul PK, Jamadagni Manoj, Karan Ananth, Jayashankar A. The team has seven cinematographers, musicians, and editors. This movie features Hariprriya, Rishab Shetty, Kishore, Raj B. Shetty, Yagna Shetty, Prakash Belawadi, Avinash, Balaji Manohar, Pramod Shetty, Hari Samasthi and others. This movie was conceptualised by Rishab Shetty as an ode to late Sri Puttanna Kanagal, director of the 1976 movie of the same name. This movie is jointly produced by H.K.Prakash, Pradeep N.R and Rishab Shetty films.

The story Paduvaarahalli (starring Avinash) was based on Hernando Téllez's short story Just lather, that's all. The third story Girgitle, directed by Shashi Kumar P starring Raj B. Shetty was inspired by Hollywood film Groundhog Day (1993).

Plot 
Katha Sangama is a family drama anthology, with one of its story that revolves around a father's attempt to build a fantasy land. Kishore, who lives in Bengaluru with his wife Yagna Shetty uses Hindi as a code language to discuss sensitive topics in front of their daughter. The film is a tribute to film director Puttanna Kanagal.

This ensemble film features another intriguing short story titled as 'Sagara Sangama' written by the 777 Charlie director, Kiranraj K. This 20 minute plot revolves around a solo woman traveler getting stuck in the middle of nowhere, only to find herself stuck with a shady looking beggar with a fierce dog, to seek help from. The 'Spotlight Documentary Film Awards' winning director has smartly conveyed the message of 'Don't judge a book by its cover' to this short story with an unexpected twist, that unfolds with a heart touching end.

Cast 

 Avinash
 Hari Samasthi
 Manasi Sudhir
 Suhan Shetty
 Heroor Dayanand Shetty
 Pratham Hosakoti
 Vasu Dixit
 Beeresh
 Raghavendra
 Nidhi Hegde

Soundtrack
The movie consists of 7 music composers for 7 stories. This includes Nobin Paul, Vasuki Vaibhav, Gagan Baderiya, Dossmode, Agnata, Girish Hothur, Vasu Dixit.

References

External links

2019 films
Indian anthology films
2010s Kannada-language films